Daniel James Gallimore (born 21 March 2003) is an English professional footballer who plays as a midfielder for Cleethorpes Town on loan from  club Scunthorpe United.

Career
Born in Grimsby, Gallimore joined Scunthorpe United's youth academy in 2011 before signing his first professional contract with the club in May 2021. He made his debut for the club in a 3–0 EFL Trophy defeat to Manchester City U23 on 24 August 2021, before making his league debut four days later as a substitute in a 1–0 win over Tranmere Rovers.

In February 2023, Gallimore signed for Northern Premier League Division One East club Cleethorpes Town on loan until the end of the season.

Personal life
Gallimore is the son of former Grimsby Town defender Tony Gallimore.

References

2003 births
Living people
English footballers
Footballers from Grimsby
Association football midfielders
Scunthorpe United F.C. players
Cleethorpes Town F.C. players
English Football League players
National League (English football) players
Northern Premier League players